Major General Sir Walter Joseph Cawthorn,  (11 June 1896 – 4 December 1970) was an Australian soldier and diplomat, commonly known as a former head of the Australian Secret Intelligence Service (ASIS).

Early life
Walter Joseph Cawthorn was born in the suburb of Prahran, on 11 June 1896, the second child of an English commercial traveller, William Cawthorn, and his wife, Fanny Adelaide, née Williams. He was educated at Melbourne High School, and became a schoolteacher, along with his younger sister, Minnie Elizabeth Cawthorn.

Military career
Bill Cawthorn, as he was known to his friends, enlisted in the 22nd Battalion, Australian Imperial Force (AIF), following the start of the First World War. During the Gallipoli campaign, he served as a regimental sergeant major. He was later commissioned into the AIF and served in France and Belgium.

He transferred to the Indian Army as a lieutenant on 25 March 1918. He served with the 46th Punjabis in Palestine from September to October 1918 and was Mentioned in Despatches in the London Gazette 12 January 1920. He joined the 4th Battalion, 16th Punjab Regiment on 25 September 1925 and attended the Camberley Staff College in 1929–30.

Cawthorn married Mary Wyman Varley in 1927 in London and they had one son, Michael John Douglas Cawthorn, who was born 10 March 1930. His son Michael would later attend the Royal Military Academy Sandhurst, and was commissioned into the Argyll and Sutherland Highlanders on 16 December 1949. However, he was killed serving in Korea on 4 April 1951 with the 1st Battalion. Cawthorn was appointed a company commander in the 4th Battalion, 16th Punjab Regiment on 1 May 1930 and served on the North West Frontier that year.

Cawthorn served on the Staff of Baluchistan District as a General Staff Officer 3rd grade (GSO 3) from 15 December 1930 to 29 February 1932. He was appointed Deputy Assistant Quarter Master General (DAQMG) on the Staff of Western Command at Quetta 1 March 1932 to 20 January 1935. He served on the Mohmand operations on the North West Frontier in 1935. He was appointed a General Staff Officer 2nd grade (GSO 2) at the War Office in London from 6 January 1937 to 2 August 1939. On 3 August 1939 he was appointed a local colonel and temporary General Staff Officer 1st grade (GSO 1).

With the rank of Brigadier, Cawthorn took charge of the Middle East Intelligence Centre, at the start of the Second World War, and later on 15 August 1941, became the Director of Military Intelligence at the General Headquarters, in India.

Cawthorn worked well with Peter Fleming and the ultra secret double agent network at GSI(d), the network faced earlier in the war at Rangoon.  Unlike Ormonde Hunter, a previous chief he was entirely sympathetic to the agency's aims.  Cawthorn had none of these suspicions about the counter-intelligence activity.  He was brought to London in March 1943 to discuss double-agents with MI5, before leaving with Churchill's team for the Trident Conference (19-30 May 1943), where he was one of the four-man British negotiating team. Hunter joined them on 28 May to sketch an outline for Operation Saucy, a plan for Japanese deception.  The full plan was fleshed out at New Delhi with Fleming, which they dubbed Ramshorn.  It was devised as a tactic to divert the Japanese Air Force away from MacArthur's main forces, but predictably John Bevan back in London shot the plan down in flames.  Cawthorne had been too ambitious; all that they could do was create 'an illusion of an amphibious landing'.
Cawthorn was appointed a temporary major general on 21 November 1943.

When the Partition of India occurred in 1947, Cawthorn opted for the Pakistan Army and from 1948 to 1951 he was Deputy Chief General Staff, Pakistan Army under Lieutenant General Ross C. McCay. Cawthorn left Pakistan in 1951.

Intelligence career and later life
From 1951 to 1954, Cawthorn was the Director of the Australian Joint Intelligence Bureau (JIB), within the Defence ministry. He came back to Pakistan in 1954 as Australia's High Commissioner to Pakistan. He was knighted in 1958, and in 1959 appointed as High Commissioner of Canada until September 1960, when he was brought back to head the Australian Secret Intelligence Service (ASIS) until 1968.

Cawthorn died in Melbourne in 1970, at the age of 74.

References

External links
Generals of World War II

1896 births
1970 deaths
Australian Army officers
Australian Knights Bachelor
Australian Commanders of the Order of the British Empire
Australian Companions of the Order of the Bath
Companions of the Order of the Indian Empire
Australian military personnel of World War I
British military personnel of the Second Mohmand Campaign
Directors-General of the Australian Secret Intelligence Service
High Commissioners of Australia to Canada
High Commissioners of Australia to Pakistan
Indian Army generals of World War II
Military personnel from Melbourne
Public servants from Melbourne
Graduates of the Staff College, Camberley
Pakistan Army officers
British Indian Army generals
Punjab Regiment officers
People from Prahran, Victoria
People educated at Melbourne High School
Australian people of English descent